Black Sea Euroregion (transcript. Chernomorski evroregion) is a seaside Euroregion, located in Bulgaria and Romania.

Creation
The Congress of the Council of Europe launched a Black Sea Euroregion on 26 September 2008, when the constituent act was signed by 14 authorities in four countries.

Composition
The region is composed of:
Burgas Province, Dobrich Province and Varna Province in Bulgaria (16,300 km2, 1,060,000 inhabitants)
Constanța County and Tulcea County in Romania (15,600 km2, 980,000 inhabitants)
The largest city is Varna, The administrative center of the euroregion is Varna. The port of Constanța is marginally the largest port on the Black Sea.

Largest cities
This is a list of cities over 10.000 inhabitants in the region:

Objectives
The "Black Sea Euro-region" initiative seeks to encourage greater awareness and careful use of the Black Sea resources and their sustainable management, as well as regionalisation processes in the area.

References

Black Sea
Euroregions of Romania
Euroregions of Bulgaria